is a Japanese erotic horror manga series written and illustrated by Toshio Maeda.

First serialized in Manga Erotopia from 1985 to 1986, Urotsukidōji marked a departure from Maeda's earlier works, with its focus on erotica, dark humor, and the supernatural. Starting in 1987, the manga was adapted into a series of original video animation (OVA) anime releases by director Hideki Takayama. The adaptations deviate significantly from the manga, adding elements of violence, sadomasochism, and rape not present in the source material.

Urotsukidōji has been credited with popularizing the trope of tentacle rape, and The Erotic Anime Movie Guide calls it a formative work in the hentai genre. In 2005, it was voted as one of the 100 greatest cartoons in a poll by Channel 4.

Synopsis

Manga
Amano Jyaku, a mischievous, sociopathic demon/human hybrid, is banished to Earth and ordered by The Great Elder to find the Chōjin: the unbeatable god of the demon world who is hiding within the body of a man.

A group of reptilian/amphibian demons want to find the Chōjin and use his power on behalf of the Queen of Demons. Under the leadership of Suikakuju, the Elder's rival and lover of his estranged wife, the Queen of Demons, they hatch a series of plots to try to capture the Chōjin, most of which go horribly wrong.

Amano is sent to protect the Chōjin, but after his lecherous friend Koroko and then later his nymphomaniac sister Megumi come to find him, this proves to be more difficult.

Anime
The saga follows Jyaku Amano—a man-beast—and his quest to find the Chōjin and to ensure the safe future of all three worlds. However, he finds his beliefs put to the test when he encounters numerous demons, who plan to destroy the Chōjin and prevent the three worlds from joining.

Characters
As the Urotsukidōji saga spans over a number of years it incorporates a wide variety of characters. Below is a list of the main characters, which are split into their races:

Ningen ("Humans")
  The human through which the Chōjin would be reborn. He is shy and lecherous. Fated to mutate into the Demon of Destruction who decimates the world to pave the way for the birth of his "messianic" offspring.
 In the anime, she is presented as a young, innocent, naive girl, and the idol at Myōjin University. In the manga, she is sometimes shown as more sexually adventurous. She becomes Nagumo's girlfriend, and the mother of the Chōjin.
  An anime-only character; Nagumo's cousin, whom Münchhausen II uses to resurrect the Kyō-Ō. He commits a series of rapes and murders under the control of the German diabolist, who contorts his mind against those he loves. He falls for Megumi Amano, only to be killed by her in the battle against Münchhausen II atop the Shinjuku skyscrapers.
  A school nerd who loves Akemi and jealously hates Nagumo. He is later used by Suikakujū as a vessel to destroy the Chōjin, with the aid of a demonic phallus which he promptly substitutes for his own. He meets his end at the hands of Nagumo, who tears out his organs.
 The jock all the girls fall for in Myōjin University. He is a major character in the manga, though is only seen in the first volume of the OVA series. Jyaku mistakes him for the Chōjin, which ultimately leads to his demise.
  A character who only appears in the manga, he is Niki's bodyguard and childhood friend. Although he appears to be morbidly obese, he is very strong and attacks anyone who bullies Niki. He later befriends Nagumo and Akemi after Niki ditches him.

Jūjin ("Beast-men")
 The male protagonist of the saga, he has been searching for the Chōjin for three hundred years. He holds to his belief in the Chōjin and his Land of Eternity, until events play out in a way totally contrary to what he hoped for.
  Jyaku's nymphomaniac sister, she believes Tatsuo to be the Chōjin from the start. In the manga, she becomes Akemi's rival. She also falls in love with Takeaki in the anime.
  One of the wisest elders in the Man-Beast realm. In the manga, he banishes Jyaku from the realm of demons for constantly fooling around with his daughter Mimi. In the anime, he helps Jyaku discover the truth behind the legend of the Chōjin. According to his own words in the second episode of the first OVA, The Great Elder has lived in the Man-Beast world for 993 years.
  The Elder's granddaughter and lover of Jyaku Amano. Her orgasm has the power to project visions of the future.

Majin ("Demons")
  Jyaku Amano's rival, and the Demon Queen's champion. His quest is to destroy the Chōjin in order to keep Makai (the "Demon World") intact.
  A demon who was banished to Hell for having an affair with Megumi, he later becomes Münchhausen II's lackey. He is mortally wounded in battle with Amano and dies after rescuing Megumi. He is not featured in the manga.
  In the manga, Ms. Togami is a nymphomaniac teacher who gets possessed by an iguana-like demon. The demon then tries to seduce Akemi, until Jyaku manages to drive the iguana-like demon out. He later tricks her into having sex, so that his magical sperm can protect her from the lizardlike demons. In the anime it is not explained whether or not she is possessed or a demon in disguise; a demon sent to Earth to hunt (and presumably destroy) the Chōjin. Despite her mission, she still finds time to rape Akemi, but Amano Jyaku intervenes and destroys her.
 Yoenki An anime-only character. She is Suikakujū's sister, who attacks is manipulated into attacking Jyaku in Osaka via Münchhausen II's mind control powers.
 Goki, Yoki, and Sekki Three demons searching for the Chōjin, who are later killed by Tatsuo. They appear only in the manga.

Makemono ("Demon-Beasts") (anime only)
 Buju A key character in the post-apocalyptic chapters of the saga. Starts off as a raping, pillaging marauder, only to find some semblance of purpose and redemption in becoming the Kyō-Ō's guardian on his long journey toward Osaka to confront the Chōjin.
 Gashim A kindhearted, elderly  who accompanies Buju, Himi, Jyaku et al. to Osaka, following his release from Caesar's captivity.
 Ruddle Another  spared from the devastating effects of Kyō-Ō's Light of Judgment at Caesar's palace. Joins Jyaku and the other  in their journey toward Osaka.
 Idaten A pure-hearted  youth who takes the high road to Osaka with his fellows. He develops an unrequited crush on Himi.

Other characters
  One of the Kuroko tribe. Holds deep respect for his boss, Amano Jyaku.
  An anime-only character. A sorcerer following the footsteps of his father who died in the service of Adolf Hitler, he is the son of a mad Nazi German scientist, hell-bent on resurrecting the Kyō-Ō and dominating the world. Having survived most of the saga, Münchhausen II is finally killed by Himi when she unleashes her power.
  An anime-only character. A supernatural being created by the Chōjin as part of a new race to both replace and exterminate the humans, Man-Beasts and demons. It has the ability to change its own gender whenever it wants, and it can also create other living beings and control the minds of other living beings into doing what it pleases. It appears in Urotsukidōji: The Final Chapter.
  The Super God. His legend reveals that every three thousand years he will be reborn into the human realm. In the anime it is to unite the different worlds into a world of peace.
  The nemesis of the Chōjin, in the anime he is born from the congealed blood of Takeaki at the Gokumon shrine. Münchhausen II desperately wants to resurrect him to take over Earth.
  The demon that Suikakujū summons from the sea to kill the Chōjin. In the anime, Suikakujūs summoning of the Sea Demon King in 1923 results in the Great Kantō earthquake.

Anime cast

Media

Manga
Urotsukidōji was first serialized in Japan in four special editions of the erotic manga magazine Manga Erotopia from July 25, 1985 to July 24, 1986. It was later released into six tankōbon volumes from December 1, 1986 to April 1, 1987.

Urotsukidōji: Legend of the Overfiend was first published in English with the launch of the adult label of CPM Manga in July 1998. It ran in a black-and-white 32-page format priced at $2.95 per issue. It was later released into six volumes from September 1, 2002 to October 15, 2003.

On December 12, 2014, English-language hentai publisher FAKKU announced plans to launch a Kickstarter campaign to publish a remastered edition of the manga, which would include color pages and chapters omitted from the previous English versions. The campaign was launched on June 20, 2016. The campaign met its goal, and the first of four volumes was released on December 8, 2016.

Anime
There are four main chapters in the original Urotsukidōji saga, along with an unfinished fifth chapter that has so far only been released in Japan and Germany, as well as a complete remake of the first chapter.

Legend of the Overfiend (1987–1989)
  (January 21, 1987) Penthouse: Volume 3
  (March 21, 1988) Penthouse: Volume 44
  (April 10, 1989) Penthouse: Volume 58

The first series was released as part of an anthology video series distributed by JAVN (Japan Audio Visual Network). The anthology series was part of the international Penthouse Magazine brand and featured international and domestic pornographic movies (such as The Devil in Miss Jones, Behind the Green Door and The Opening of Misty Beethoven to name a few).

The first three-volume series within the larger Penthouse series was named . These three episodes were adapted from the original manga but skip over much of the comedic sub-stories and subplots and instead shift the focus to the apocalypse and the battle between Suikakuju and Jyaku.

The removal of certain explicit material resulted in the film being given a  rating from Japan's Film Classification and Rating Organization. Shochiku-Fuji distributed the film to theaters while Shochiku Home Video distributed the film to VHS with the tagline .

Legend of the Over-Fiend was shown at the Toronto Festival of Festivals on September 16, 1989. A critic credited as "Suze." wrote in Variety the film was a "sci-fi-horror schlock extravaganza verging on porno. Films like this are why the word misogynist was invented."

The theatrical film was released in North America on VHS on August 11, 1993, by Central Park Media under the "Anime 18" label - it was their first title to be released with the label. The film was also released in the UK and Australia, with additional cuts being made by the BBFC and OFLC.

 Plot
Planet Earth is not all it seems. It is revealed that humans are not alone and that there are unseen realms running parallel to our own: the realms of the Demons (Makai) and the Man-Beasts (Jyujinkai). To further that, there is a 3000-year-old legend that foretells the coming of the Overfiend (Chōjin)—a being of unimaginable power that will unite all three realms into a land of eternity.

The story follows the exploits of the protagonists—man-beast Jyaku Amano, his nymphomaniac sister Megumi and their companion Kuroko—as their 300-year search for the Overfiend takes them to a high school in Osaka, Japan. Their discoveries led them to two students: shy, lecherous Tatsuo Nagumo and school idol Akemi Ito. But as the film plunges deeper into the dark and gruesome, Jyaku discovers that the Legend of the Overfiend is not what it seems and that the future of the three realms may be strikingly different from what he is led to believe.

DVD releases
 Perfect Collection (Anime 18)—2:26:06
 Special DVD Edition (Manga Entertainment)—1:42:55
 Movie Edition (Kitty Media)—1:45:20

The Perfect Collection from Anime 18 is the only English-friendly uncut version of the first OVA available outside Japan. Other versions such as the one on the "Hell on Earth" boxed set and the Australian Madman release with both Legend of the Overfiend and Legend of the Demon Womb have been cut for 45 minutes in total, which included a total of 24 minutes of sexually-oriented scenes. The U.S. DVD releases are now out-of-print. The Movie Edition, licensed by Kitty Media in 2010 and released in 2011, is the first time any of the anime has been released on Blu-ray, though it is reformatted for widescreen (the DVD version released alongside it retains the original aspect ratio).

Legend of the Demon Womb (1990–1991)
 "A Prayer for the Resurrection of the Lord of Chaos" (December 1, 1990)
 "Battle at Shinjuku Skyscrapers" (April 10, 1991)

The second OVA series was named . This series was not based on the manga, but elements from it were used, with Negumo's cousin Takeaki taking on a character similar to the character of Saburo in the manga and Münchhausen II taking after the character of Suikakuju.

The second part of the saga created an ongoing controversy among Urotsukidōji fans as to where it fits into the saga as a whole. One main theory is that the two chapters happen between "Birth of the Overfiend" and "Curse of the Overfiend" of the first OVA. Another main theory is that since the characters and tone are fairly unfaithful to the first three OVAs, it ought not to be considered part of the canon in the first place.

The two OVAs were again later recut into a theatrical version, known as Urotsukidōji II: Legend of the Demon Womb; however, whereas the original two OVA episodes in this case censored sexual acts with blurring throughout, the movie edit was fully uncensored and even featured additional scenes with new animation and effects added to improve existing scenes. No material was taken out in the process—the time difference arising due to redundant credits and recaps—so the movie is to be considered the most complete version.

Unbeknownst to Jyaku and Megumi, in 1944, the Nazis attempted to summon the Overfiend's nemesis: the Lord of Chaos (Kyō-Ō). Top scientist Dr. Münchhausen and his son invented a perverse death-rape machine to summon the Lord of Chaos—but the machine overloaded; and helped to destroy half of Berlin—leaving Münchhausen II alive, but psychologically scarred.

During his adolescence, Münchhausen II discovers his father's journal and tries to uncover the secrets of the Jyujinkai and the Makai. He finally succeeds and reawakens Kohoki—a demon banished to hell for eternity—into the human realm and the two form an infamous partnership.

Cut to the present day and Münchhausen II is trying to fulfill his father's work—to summon the Lord of Chaos—but to make sure it will work this time, he needs a human sacrifice. And it just so happens Tatsuo's cousin Takeaki Kiryu is on the next plane to Osaka...

DVD releases
 Perfect Collection (Anime 18)—1:37:33
 Urotsukidōji II: Legend of the Demon Womb (Anime 18)—1:26:51
 Special DVD Edition (Manga Entertainment)—1:23:32

The Perfect Collection from Anime 18 is the only uncut version of the second Urotsukidōji OVA available outside Japan—however, even the Japanese version was censored and this censoring was carried over. As mentioned above, this was rectified for the movie version which is uncensored and contains more original material than the OVAs. Anime 18's DVD release is uncut though others (such as Manga UK's) have again been censored with cuts made. Both Japanese and English-language tracks are included on Anime 18's DVD of the movie, but there are no subtitles. Like the Perfect Collection, it is not region-coded. Other versions such as the one on the "Hell on Earth" boxed set and the Australian Madman release with both Legend of the Overfiend and Legend of the Demon Womb have been cut for 14 minutes in total, which included a total of 7 minutes of sexually-oriented scenes. The U.S. releases are also now out-of-print.

Return of the Overfiend (1992–1993)
 "Birth of the True Overfiend" (October 1, 1992)
 "The Mystery of Caesar's Palace" (January 21, 1993)
 "The Collapse of Caesar's Palace" (May 21, 1993)
 "Journey to an Unknown World" (August 21, 1993)

The third OVA series was named . This is where the saga begins to focus less on the remaining central characters and introduces other secondary characters, none of whom are present in the manga. The four parts were edited for western audiences as Urotsukidōji: Return of the Overfiend, in some cases cut into a pair of films.

At the end of "Final Inferno", it is discovered that the Chōjin is the offspring of Tatsuo and Akemi and of Tatsuo's horrific metamorphosis into the Demon of Destruction—who needs to "destroy the old to make way for the new".

Twenty years have passed and the Chojin has been prematurely born. He summons Jyaku Amano to protect him and to help to discover what has happened, sending Jyaku forth to search for the evil born in the east. Unfortunately a new race called the Makemono (Demon-Beasts) have arisen following the apocalypse, ruled over by the fanatical cyborg Caesar and his mysterious comrade "Faust". It is apparent they are the cause behind these events and intend to resurrect the Kyō-Ō.

Jyaku, along with the Makemono Buju and Caesar's traitorous daughter Alector, need to stop the two dictators from ruling the land of eternity. The question is, who will succeed?

Inferno Road (1993–1995)
 "The Secret Garden" (December 21, 1993)
 "The Long Road to God" (March 21, 1994)
 "The End of the Journey" (May 20, 1995)

The fourth OVA series was named . It was banned outright in many countries (including Britain), but was edited again for the west under the title Urotsukidōji: Inferno Road.

Continuing straight after the climax of Return of the Overfiend, Jyaku and the survivors head for Osaka to help the Overfiend after his climactic battle. On the way they find a kingdom where children rule over adults (OVAs 1 and 2). Jyaku's problems are furthered when an old nemesis shows up at the wrong time (OVA 3).

The third OVA in this series, "The End of the Journey", stands alone plot-wise (wrapping up the story arc from Urotsukidoji: Return of the Overfiend, on which the first two OVA have no bearing), and was originally intended to be a theatrical release. It is based on the final chapters of Maeda's New Urotsukidoji.

NOTE: Inferno Road was originally intended to have another ending, which was fully completed but ultimately discarded. This ending was to have revealed that the apparent Chōjin as seen at the start of Urotsukidoji: Return of the Overfiend was not in fact the real Chōjin, but yet another Makai. This alternate ending was to have set up the abandoned The Final Chapter.

The Final Chapter (1996)
 "The Final" (December 28, 1996)

The fifth OVA series was named , also known as Urotsukidōji: The Final Chapter in the west. Only one episode of this was partially completed, the released version containing numerous examples of animation that is missing in-between frames. The story, as such, concerned the arrival of the real Chōjin who creates a new hermaphroditic race to wipe out all remaining life on Earth.

After giving birth to the Chōjin, Akemi reawakens in a hospital, along with Jyaku, who had barely survived a recent confrontation with the Chōjin (whose form constantly mutates between male and female). Destroyer God Tatsuo also reappears (after supposedly being killed by Kyō-Ō in Urotsukidoji: Return of the Overfiend) and continues his ravaging of Earth. Still in love with Tatsuo, Akemi runs out to find him.

Meanwhile, Jyaku is confronted by some of the Chōjin's new 'children', and engages them in battle. However, his efforts prove almost futile, as they are constantly regenerated by the Chojin.
Akemi eventually finds Tatsuo, still in his God form, and pleads with him. He clutches her in his hand (similarly to the end of the first episode) and prepares to kill her. However, she is rescued at the last minute by Jyaku, although she condemns him for doing so.

New Urotsukidōji: New Saga (2002)
 "The Urotsuki: Part I" (May 3, 2002)
 "The Urotsuki: Part II" (August 9, 2002)
 "The Urotsuki: Part III" (November 19, 2002)

This series was named , also known as Urotsukidōji: New Saga in the west, and was released in North America on March 9, 2004. This three-disc collection is a retelling of the first episode in The Legend of the Overfiend. It has the same basic plot as Birth of the Overfiend, the only difference is that Ozaki is now one of the main characters, and the story focuses more on him, while Nagumo is now a supporting character.

New Urotsukidoji manga
After the popularity of the anime version of his work, Maeda sought to redo the Urotsukidoji series. Inspired by the post-apocalyptic story in the anime version, Maeda fleshed out the story and also took it into the realm of the post-apocalyptic.

The Urotsuki video series and the Urotsukidoji horror film are the only anime works which have borrowed from this series.

See also
 Ero guro
 Tentacle erotica
  (魔界)

References

Sources

External links
 
 Feature on the Japanese Urotsukidoji PC game
 Russian Urotsukidoji Data Base
 Toshio Maeda Official website
 

1986 manga
1987 anime OVAs
Anime 18
Anime and manga controversies
Film controversies
Apocalyptic anime and manga
Dieselpunk
Dystopian anime and manga
Fiction about monsters
Erotic horror films
Hentai anime and manga
Horror anime and manga
Japanese animated horror films
Manga Entertainment
Obscenity controversies in animation
Obscenity controversies in film
Pornographic horror films
Pornographic animation
Films with screenplays by Shō Aikawa
Seinen manga
Supernatural anime and manga
Penthouse (magazine)
Wanimagazine manga